The Ways of Freedom is a solo piano album by Sergey Kuryokhin.

Releases and reception
The album was first released by the Soviet label Melodiya. It was reissued by Leo Records. The Penguin Guide to Jazz wrote that Kuryokhin "can sound as tightly disciplined as a classical pianist and as vividly intense and rapid-fingered as [Art] Tatum." The AllMusic reviewer concluded: "This is an incredible document and shouldn't be missed by any serious student of avant-garde piano."

Track listing
 "Theory and Practice" – 7:00
 "The Wall" – 2:23
 "The Rules of the Game" – 2:11
 "Archipelago" – 8:44
 "No Exit" – 1:47
 "The Inner Fear" – 1:04
 "The Other Way" – 15:46
 "The Great Escape" – 4:44
 "Fresh Air" – 4:20
 "New Dawn" – 3:29

References

1981 albums
Solo piano jazz albums